Sir Albert Lambert Ward, 1st Baronet  (7 November 1875 – 21 October 1956) was a volunteer soldier in the Territorial Army and a Conservative Party politician in the United Kingdom.

Ward was an officer of the Honourable Artillery Company, he was commissioned a second lieutenant in 1902. He was promoted to lieutenant in 1904. He was still a lieutenant at the formation of the Territorial Army in 1908, and was promoted to captain in 1913. He fought in World War I, soon being promoted to temporary Major and ultimately rising to the (substantive) rank of lieutenant-colonel. 

In 1916, he commanded the Howe Battalion of the Royal Naval Division. After the war he continued as an officer, initially reverting to the rank of major. He was awarded the Territorial Decoration TD in 1919. He was re-promoted to Lieutenant-Colonel in 1924 (re-gaining his former seniority), commanding the unit for a period up to 1928. He was given a brevet (military) promotion to colonel in 1927. In 1931 he was made Honorary Colonel of the 50th (Northumbrian) Divisional Train in the Royal Army Service Corps.

He contested Hull West for the Conservatives at the December 1910 general election, but was not elected. However, he was returned at the 1918 general election as the Member of Parliament (MP) for Kingston upon Hull North West, and held the seat until his defeat in the Labour Party landslide at the 1945 election. He served under Ramsay MacDonald as a Lord of the Treasury from 1931 to 1935 and as Vice-Chamberlain of the Household in 1935, under Stanley Baldwin as Vice-Chamberlain of the Household in 1935 and as Comptroller of the Household from 1935 to 1937 and under Neville Chamberlain as Treasurer of the Household in 1937.

Ward was made a Baronet, of Blyth in the County of Northumberland, in the 1929 King's Birthday Honours. He was made a Commander of the Royal Victorian Order in 1937. In 1946 he was appointed a Deputy Lieutenant for the County of London.

Family

He was the son of Albert Bird Ward (1840–?) and Louisa Emma  (Lambert) Ward (1845–?), his sister, Louisa Isabel Ward (1872–1969), married John Edward Thornycroft. 

In 1920, he married Constance Vivian (née Tidmas; 1890–1976). Their daughter, Diana Josephine Lambert Ward (1921–2004), Lady Spearman, was the second wife of Sir Alexander Cadwallader Mainwaring Spearman.

Footnotes

References

Conservative Party (UK) MPs for English constituencies
UK MPs 1918–1922
UK MPs 1922–1923
UK MPs 1923–1924
UK MPs 1924–1929
UK MPs 1929–1931
UK MPs 1931–1935
UK MPs 1935–1945
Ward, Sir Albert, 1st baronet
1875 births
1956 deaths
Treasurers of the Household
Commanders of the Royal Victorian Order
Companions of the Distinguished Service Order
Deputy Lieutenants of the County of London
Ministers in the Chamberlain peacetime government, 1937–1939
Honourable Artillery Company officers
British Army personnel of World War I
Royal Army Service Corps officers